Ptyodactylus puiseuxi, common names Israeli fan-fingered gecko and Levante fan-fingered gecko, is a species of lizard in the family Phyllodactylidae. The species is endemic to the Middle East.

Etymology
The specific name, puiseuxi, is in honor of French astronomer Victor Alexandre Puiseux.

Description
P. puiseuxi is a medium-sized gecko. It is light to dark brown, with numerous white spots on the dorsal surface. The head is large and triangular. The tail has several white bands, and is shorter than the overall head and body length (snout-to-vent length). The dorsal scales are small and granular.

Geographic range
P. puiseuxi is found in Iraq, Israel, Jordan, Lebanon, Saudi Arabia, and Syria.

Habitat and behaviour
P. puiseuxi usually emerges after dark to feed, but can be seen in rocky, shady areas, and near caves.

Reproduction
P. puiseuxi is oviparous.

References

Further reading
Boutan L (1893). "Mémoire sur les Reptiles rapportés de Syrie par le Dr Th. Barrois, 1re partie, genre Ptyodactyle ". Revue Biologique du Nord de la France 5 (9-10): 329-345, 369-384 + Plate III. (Ptyodactylus puiseuxi, new species, pp. 379–384 + Plate III, figure 4). (in French).
Rösler H (2000). "Kommentierte Liste der rezent, subrezent und fossil bekannten Geckotaxa (Reptilia: Gekkonomorpha)". Gekkota 2: 28-153. (Ptyodactylus puiseuxi, p. 107). (in German).
Sindaco R, Jeremčenko VK (2008). The Reptiles of the Western Palearctic. 1. Annotated Checklist and Distributional Atlas of the Turtles, Crocodiles, Amphisbaenians and Lizards of Europe, North Africa, Middle East and Central Asia. (Monographs of the Societas Herpetologica Italica). Latina, Italy: Edizioni Belvedere. 580 pp. . 
Werner YL, Sivan N (1993). "Systematics and zoogeography of Ptyodactylus (Reptilia: Sauria: Gekkonidae) in the Levant: 1. Biometry of three species in Israel". Revista Española de Herpetología 7: 47-64.
Werner YL, Sivan N (1994). "Systematics and zoogeography of Ptyodactylus (Reptilia: Sauria: Gekkonidae) in the Levant: 2. Taxonomy, with a review of ecology and zoogeography". Revista Española de Herpetología 8: 105-122.

Ptyodactylus
Reptiles of the Middle East
Geckos of Iraq
Reptiles of Jordan
Reptiles of Syria
Reptiles described in 1893